Jacques Cornu (born 15 May 1953) is a former Grand Prix motorcycle road racer from Switzerland. His best year was in 1988 when he won two races and finished in third place in the 250cc world championship. Cornu won three Grand Prix races during his career. In 1982, he teamed up with Jean Claude Chemarin to win the FIM Endurance World Championship.

Motorcycle Grand Prix results
Points system from 1969 to 1987:

Points system from 1988 to 1992:

(key) (Races in bold indicate pole position; races in italics indicate fastest lap)

References 

1953 births
Swiss motorcycle racers
250cc World Championship riders
350cc World Championship riders
Living people